Château des Anglais may refer to:
 Château des Anglais (Autoire), a castle in the commune of Autoire in the Lot département of France
 Château des Anglais (Brengues), a castle in the commune of Brengues in the Lot département of France